Alvin Kevin Daniels (born 10 February 1994) is a Dutch professional footballer of Guianese descent who plays as winger. He formerly played for FC Twente, FC Dordrecht and SC Cambuur. He was born in Paramaribo, Suriname.

Club career
On 29 January 2021, he signed a contract with Italian club Como until the end of the 2020–21 season.

International career
In 2014, Daniels was selected for the Netherlands national under-21 football team. However, it was later discovered that he did not have Dutch nationality, and thus was ineligible to represent the Netherlands. He remained eligible to represent France as part of the French Guiana national football team.

References

External links
 

1994 births
Surinamese emigrants to the Netherlands
Living people
Sportspeople from Paramaribo
Dutch footballers
FC Twente players
FC Dordrecht players
SC Cambuur players
FC Eindhoven players
Como 1907 players
Eerste Divisie players
Serie C players
Dutch expatriate footballers
Expatriate footballers in Italy
Association football wingers
Jong FC Twente players
Dutch expatriate sportspeople in Italy